Eskild Dall (born 8 January 2003) is a Danish footballer who plays as a forward for Brøndby IF under-19.

Career
Dall started his career with Dutch top flight side Ajax. Before the second half of 2021–22, he was sent on loan to AGF in Denmark. On 10 April 2022, Dall debuted for AGF during a 2–2 draw with FCN.

References

External links
 

2003 births
Living people
Sportspeople from Aalborg
Danish men's footballers
Danish Superliga players
AFC Ajax players
Aarhus Gymnastikforening players
Danish expatriate men's footballers
Danish expatriate sportspeople in the Netherlands
Expatriate footballers in the Netherlands